Gasolin' is the first album with English lyrics by rock band Gasolin' in an attempt to win the band recognition outside their native Denmark. It is almost identical to their third Danish album, Gasolin' 3 and was released in some Western European countries in the beginning of 1974 on CBS. It failed to make impact on the charts anywhere, but didn't stop Gasolin' from issuing three more albums in English in the period from 1974 to 1978.

History 
After the artistic and commercial success of Gasolin' 2, singer and principal songwriter Kim Larsen left the band. He was unhappy as he felt that too many of his new songs were rejected by the other band members. Poul Bruun, the director of CBS in Denmark, afraid to see the band disappear resolved the situation by letting Larsen record a solo album, Værsgo. He further allowed Gasolin' to record their next album in two versions, one in Danish for the home market and one with English lyrics to be released in Europe. To provide the right international sound, the record company brought Englishman Roy Thomas Baker to Copenhagen to produce the album in August 1973. Baker, at the time a hot name in the record industry following his recent success with Queen, had already worked as engineer on the band's debut album Gasolin' in 1970 and was happy to work with them again. After finishing Gasolin' 3, the band teamed up with Leonard "Skip" Malone, an American living in Denmark at the time, who helped the band translate the Danish lyrics into English. The lyrics were re-recorded in January 1974 and the resulting album released shortly after.

Song selection 
Seven of the songs are taken from the original Danish album Gasolin' 3 (released a few months before). The last two, "If You Dare" and "Lilli-Lilli", are re-recordings (with Baker as producer) of "Langebro" and "Lilli-Lilli" respectively, that were first released on the band's first album, Gasolin' in 1971.

Track listing 
Except where otherwise noted, the music is written by Gasolin' and the lyrics by Gasolin' and Skip Malone.

Side one 
"Lucky Linda" – 5:02
"If You Dare" (Trad. / Lyrics: Gasolin', Malone) – 3:15
"Quasimodo's Song" – 4:05
"Lilli-Lilli" – 4:55

Side two 
"It Was Inga, Katinka And Groovy Charlie On His Harley" (Music: Tommy Pedersen / Lyrics: Gasolin', Malone) – 2:51
"The Big Hullabaloo" – 2:28
"The Cat" – 2:50
"Stark Raving Mad" – 3:15
"Sju-Bi-Du-Bi-Man" – 5:53

Personnel

Gasolin'
 Kim Larsen – vocals, rhythm guitar, lead guitar on "It Was Inga, Katinka..." and "Quasimodo's Song"
 Franz Beckerlee – lead guitar, moog, vocals, bass on "Stark Raving Mad"
 Wili Jønsson – bass, piano, organ, vocals
 Søren Berlev – drums, percussion

Additional musicians
 Niels Harrit – tenor saxophone, baritone saxophone, percussion

Production
 Roy Thomas Baker – producer
 Freddy Hansson – engineer

Release history

References

Footnotes 

Gasolin' albums
1974 albums
Albums produced by Roy Thomas Baker